Chongqing Jianzhu University was a university in Chongqing, People's Republic of China, from 1952 to 2000. On May 31, 2000, it merged with Chongqing University to form a higher-level 985 engineering school.

Alumni
Chongqing University had many notable alumni including:
Ren Zhengfei, Founder and President of Huawei

References

External links
 

1952 establishments in China
2000 disestablishments in China
Educational institutions established in 1952
Educational institutions disestablished in 2000
Universities and colleges in Chongqing
History of Chongqing